Cochran Gardens was a public housing complex on the near north side of downtown St. Louis, Missouri. Construction was completed in 1953. The complex was occupied until 2006. It was famous for its residents' innovative form of tenant-led management. In 1976, Cochran Gardens became one of the first U.S. housing projects to have tenant management.

Built by the same firm, Leinweber, Yamasaki & Hellmuth, as the infamous Pruitt–Igoe complex, Cochran Gardens was more successful than its ill-fated sister project. In the mid 1970s, Bertha Gilkey and a group of friends successfully led a community driven rehabilitation effort; in 1976 she won a property management contract from the city. Independent management improved Cochran Gardens and created small business jobs in the neighborhood. President George H. W. Bush visited the site in 1991, commending tenant management and Bertha Gilkey. However, in 1998 city authorities took over Cochran Gardens, citing tax mismanagement by the tenant association. The buildings rapidly deteriorated, by 1999 vacancy rate increased from under 10% to one-third.

Cochran Gardens, which survived into the 21st century, was demolished in 2008.

See also
Cabrini–Green Homes, in Chicago, Illinois
Robert Taylor Homes, in Chicago, Illinois
St. James Town, in Toronto, Canada
Ballymun Flats, in Dublin, Ireland
Red Road (flats), in Glasgow, United Kingdom
Hulme Crescents, in Manchester, United Kingdom
Panel house, in various communist countries

Notes

Further reading

External links
Photos of Cochran Gardens 

Residential buildings completed in 1952
Buildings and structures in St. Louis
Buildings and structures demolished in 2008
Public housing in St. Louis
Demolished buildings and structures in St. Louis